In the past, Pygophora  has been considered an order of barnacles. Research published in 2021 by Chan et al. resulted in the orders Pygophora and Apygophora being classified as families under the order Lithoglyptida.

References

Obsolete arthropod taxa